Achalla is the capital of Awka North, a Local Government Area in Anambra State, south-central Nigeria.  It comprises eight villages: Umudiani, Amukabia, Odawa, Umuogbe, Umunagu, Umuozede, Udezu and Amadim.

Populated places in Anambra State